Veterans Day is observed annually in Sweden on May 29 at the Maritime Museum in Stockholm in honor of people who are or have been serving with the Swedish Armed Forces in international military operations, as well as commemorating those who died during their service. It coincides with the International Day of United Nations Peacekeepers. Members of the Swedish Royal Family attend the ceremony.

References

May observances
Military of Sweden
Sweden